Castaños is a city in the northern Mexican state of Coahuila. 
It is located at 101° 25' 58" West, 26° 47' 3"  North, in the state's central region (Región Centro).

External links
 Municipal information on Coahuila state website 

Populated places in Coahuila